The 2009 Vivendi Trophy with Seve Ballesteros, formerly known as the Seve Trophy, was played 24–27 September at Golf de Saint-Nom-la-Bretèche in France. The team captain for Great Britain and Ireland was Paul McGinley, with the captain for Continental Europe being Thomas Bjørn. Great Britain and Ireland won the Trophy for the fifth consecutive time.

Format 
The format remained the same for the fourth successive time. The teams competed over four days with five fourball matches on both Thursday and Friday, four greensomes matches on Saturday morning, four foursomes matches on Saturday afternoon and ten singles matches on Sunday. It means a total of 28 points are available with 14½ points required for victory. If the score finished at 14–14, then two players from each team would play the 18th using the greensomes format to find the winner.

There was a big reduction in the prize money for the 2009 event. Each member of the winner team received €65,000, the losing team €55,000 each, giving a total prize fund of €1,150,000.

Teams 
The teams were made up of five players from the World Rankings list and five players from the European points list following the conclusion of the Mercedes-Benz Championship on 14 September 2009. There were a number of players who qualified for the trophy, but pulled out. These include Pádraig Harrington, Sergio García, Lee Westwood, Martin Kaymer and Paul Casey.

Day one
Thursday, 24 September 2009

Fourball

Day two
Friday, 25 September 2009

Fourball

Day three
Saturday, 26 September 2009

Morning greensomes

Afternoon foursomes

Day four
Sunday, 27 September 2009

Singles

Anthony Wall injured his shoulder on Friday afternoon. He did not play on the Saturday and was still unfit to play in the singles on Sunday. Under the rules of the event a half was agreed with a player chosen by Thomas Bjørn to sit out the singles.

References

External links
Coverage on European Tour's official site

Seve Trophy
Golf tournaments in France
Vivendi Trophy
Vivendi Trophy
Vivendi Trophy